Lucia Súkenníková Mikulčík (born 22 June 1988) is a Slovak handball player for DHK Baník Most and the Slovak national team.

References

1988 births
Living people
Slovak female handball players
Sportspeople from Trnava